Gabriel Woolf (born 2 October 1932) is a British film, radio and television actor.

Career
Among Woolf's leading parts was his performance as the Apostle John in a frequently repeated BBC adaptation of The Man Born to Be King where he also introduced each play.
His film roles include Sir Percival in the 1953 film, Knights of the Round Table and Sutekh in the 1975 Doctor Who serial Pyramids of Mars.

Woolf renewed his association with Doctor Who in 1981 by reading three novelisations of Doctor Who stories for the Royal National Institute of Blind People. The books were The Three Doctors, Doctor Who and the Carnival of Monsters and Doctor Who and the Loch Ness Monster, all written by Terrance Dicks.

He joined up with the Doctor again by performing in the Big Finish Productions audio play Arrangements for War and its sequel, Thicker than Water. He appeared on the Pyramids of Mars DVD in a sketch called Oh Mummy: Sutekh's Story and a documentary piece titled Osiran Gothic.

In 2005, he returned to work with the writers of Oh Mummy, appearing in the Doctor Who DVD extra Eye On Blatchford as the demented Doctor Amadeus Gowel. In the Magic Bullet Faction Paradox audio plays Coming to Dust (2005), The Ship of a Billion Years (2006) and Body Politic (2008), all written by Lawrence Miles, Woolf reprises his role as Sutekh.

In 2008 Woolf played Witchfinder General Matthew Hopkins in the third story in the Scarifyers series, For King and Country. The play was broadcast on BBC7 in 2009.

In the 2006 series of Doctor Who, Woolf returned to provide the voice of "The Beast" in the two part story "The Impossible Planet" and "The Satan Pit".

His many parts on BBC Radio include Shakespeare's Romeo and Inspector Charles Parker in the dramatisations of the Lord Peter Wimsey mysteries. He toured with the author Colin Dexter, performing readings to accompany Dexter's talks. 

Woolf is also a Vice President of the Joyful Company of Singers.

Arthur Ransome
Woolf has abridged and recorded all of Arthur Ransome's Swallows and Amazons series of children's books. He was also elected President of the Arthur Ransome Society.

Personal life
He is married to the opera singer Dame Felicity Lott and they have a daughter, Emily (b. 1984).

He also has two children from his earlier marriage to Zara E Green.

Filmography

References

External links
 
 Magic Bullet's Coming to Dust Faction Paradox audio play.
 Magic Bullet's The Ship of a Billion Years Faction Paradox audio play.
 Joyful Company of Singers

1932 births
Living people
Place of birth missing (living people)
English male film actors
English male television actors
English male voice actors